Carmela Cantisani is an Italian para-alpine skier.

She represented Italy at the 1988 Winter Paralympics and she won the bronze medal in the Women's downhill B1 event. She also won the gold medals at the 1986 World Disabled Ski Championships at the Giant Slalom B1 and Downhill B1 events.

References

Living people
Year of birth missing (living people)
Place of birth missing (living people)
Italian female alpine skiers
Paralympic alpine skiers of Italy
Alpine skiers at the 1988 Winter Paralympics
Medalists at the 1988 Winter Paralympics
Paralympic bronze medalists for Italy
Paralympic medalists in alpine skiing
21st-century Italian women